Bess Press is an American publisher, based in Hawaii, that issues various books on Hawaiian and Pacific history and culture.  It was founded in 1979 by Benjamin "Buddy" Bess, who came to Hawaii in 1976 from New York.

Bess bought the rights to two out-of-print textbooks on Hawaiian language, Hawaii: The Aloha State and Hawaii: Our Island State that local schools asked about when he was a sales representative for mainland publishers. He reprinted both volumes for $15,000, and pre-sold the copies, thus making a profit.

References

External links
Official site

Book publishing companies based in Hawaii
Publishing companies established in 1979
1979 establishments in Hawaii
Hawaiian studies